Milówka  is a village in the administrative district of Gmina Wojnicz, within Tarnów County, Lesser Poland Voivodeship, in southern Poland.

The village has a population of 690.

References 

Villages in Tarnów County